Pristis is a genus of sawfish of the family Pristidae. These large fish are found worldwide in tropical and subtropical regions in coastal marine waters, estuaries, and freshwater lakes and rivers. Sawfish have declined drastically and all species are considered critically endangered today.

Taxonomy
The scientific genus name Pristis is derived from the Greek word for saw.

Living species
Recent authorities recognize four species:

 Pristis clavata Garman, 1906 — dwarf sawfish, Queensland sawfish
 Pristis pectinata Latham, 1794 — smalltooth sawfish
 Pristis pristis  (Linnaeus, 1758)  — largetooth sawfish, common sawfish, freshwater sawfish, Leichhardt's sawfish
 Pristis zijsron Bleeker, 1851 — longcomb sawfish, green sawfish

These are divided into two species groups. Most are considered a part of the smalltooth group, except P. pristis which is the sole member of the largetooth group. Two additional species, P. microdon and P. perotteti, have historically been recognized, but in 2013 it was shown that they are conspecific with P. pristis as morphological and genetic differences are lacking, leading recent authorities to treat them as synonyms. Anoxypristis cuspidata was formerly included in Pristis, but it has a number of distinctive features (for example, no teeth on the basal quarter of the saw) and recent authorities place it in its own genus.

Extinct species
According to Fossilworks, extinct Pristis species only known from fossil remains include:

 Pristis acutidens Agassiz 1843
 Pristis amblodon Cope 1869
 Pristis aquitanicus Delfortrie 1871
 Pristis atlanticus Zbyszewski 1947
 Pristis bisulcatus Agassiz 1843
 Pristis brachyodon Cope 1869
 Pristis brayi Casier 1949
 Pristis caheni Dartevelle and Casier 1959
 Pristis contortus Dixon 1850
 Pristis curvidens Leidy 1855
 Pristis dubius Münster 1846
 Pristis ensidens Leidy 1855
 Pristis fajumensis Stromer 1905
 Pristis hastingsiae Agassiz 1843
 Pristis lanceolatus Jonet 1968
 Pristis lathami Galeotti 1837
 Pristis olbrechtsi Dartevelle and Casier 1959
 Pristis pectinatus Latham 1794
 Pristis pickeringi Case 1981
 Pristis prosulcatus Stromer 1905

However, among this list are some species considered invalid by recent authorities and others now generally recognized as belonging in Anoxypristis. Fossil Pristis range from the Late Paleocene to the Quaternary period. Fossils have been found all over the world.

References

 
Marine fish genera